The Morong River, also referred to as the Morong-Teresa River, is a river system in Rizal, Philippines. It is one of 21 major tributaries of Laguna de Bay. It covers 14 barangays and stretches  from Antipolo down to Teresa, Rizal, Morong, Rizal and finally to Laguna de Bay.

On 1991, a study noted that eutrophication in Laguna de Bay could be attributed to nutrients brought to the lake as a result of the tremendous deterioration of the Morong River and the San Pedro River. In the case of the Morong River, this increase was said to be a result of draining effluents from hog farms.

A 1994 cleanup drive initiated by the Laguna Lake Development Authority in cooperation with the local communities and local government units of Antipolo, Morong, and Teresa removed some seven truckloads of garbage and cleared a  portion of the river from water lilies blocking the waterway.

References

See also
 Laguna de Bay
 Laguna Lake Development Authority

Rivers of the Philippines
Tributaries of Laguna de Bay
Landforms of Rizal